Sherman Rockwell Clark (November 16, 1899 – November 8, 1980) was an American rowing coxswain who competed in the 1920 Summer Olympics.

In 1920, he was coxed the American boat from the United States Naval Academy, which won the gold medal in the men's eight. He also won the silver medal as coxswain of the American boat in the coxed four event.

He graduated from the United States Naval Academy in 1922. He retired as a rear admiral.

References

External links
 

1899 births
1980 deaths
Coxswains (rowing)
Rowers at the 1920 Summer Olympics
Olympic gold medalists for the United States in rowing
Olympic silver medalists for the United States in rowing
American male rowers
Medalists at the 1920 Summer Olympics